is a Japanese footballer who plays as a midfielder for Iwaki FC, on loan from Fagiano Okayama.

Club career
Miyazaki is an academy graduate of Albirex Niigata, having joined the club at the age of 15 and was rewarded with his first professional contract on 8 May 2015. He made his debut on 7 November 2015, appearing as a substitute in a 2–0 defeat at home to Shonan Bellmare.

In December 2016, Miyazaki was loaned to J2 League side Zweigen Kanazawa for the 2017 season.

Club statistics
Updated to 25 February 2019.

References

External links
Profile at Zweigen Kanazawa
Profile at Albirex Niigata

1998 births
Living people
Association football people from Gunma Prefecture
Japanese footballers
J1 League players
J2 League players
Albirex Niigata players
Zweigen Kanazawa players
Iwaki FC players
FC Tokyo players
Association football midfielders